Tent Island is one of the Dellbridge Islands in McMurdo Sound, Antarctica.

See also 
 Composite Antarctic Gazetteer
 List of Antarctic and sub-Antarctic islands
 List of Antarctic islands south of 60° S
 SCAR
 Territorial claims in Antarctica

References

Ross Archipelago